Spoiling the Game (German: Strich durch die Rechnung) is a 1932 German comedy film directed by Alfred Zeisler and starring Heinz Rühmann, Toni van Eyck, and Hermann Speelmans. Its hero is a young cyclist who enters a race.

It was made by German's largest film company UFA and shot at the Babelsberg Studios in Berlin. The film's sets were designed by the art directors Willi Herrmann and Herbert Lippschitz. A separate French-language version  was also released.

Cast
 Heinz Rühmann as Willy Streblow - Rennfahrer  
 Toni van Eyck as Hanni 
 Hermann Speelmans as Erwin Banz - Rennfahrer  
 Margarete Kupfer as Mutter Streblow  
 Jakob Tiedtke as Spengler - Fahrradhändler  
 Gustl Gstettenbaur as Gustl Spengler - sein Sohn 
 Ludwig Stössel 
 Flockina von Platen as Gina Paradies  
 Fritz Odemar as Lißmann - Prokurist  
 Harry Hardt as Manuel Rodriguet - Rennfahrer  
 Otto Wallburg as Gottfried Paradies  
 Fritz Kampers as Fritz Wagmüller - Willys Schrittmacher  
 Kurt Pulvermacher as Der kleine Paradies  
 Hans Zesch-Ballot as Hans Donath - Sportjournalist  
 Carl Balhaus 
 Trude Tandar 
 Ernst Behmer
 Adolf Fischer 
 Charlie Kracker 
 Emilie Kurz
 Wera Liessem
 Ernst Morgan 
 Liselotte Rosen
 Hans Hermann Schaufuß 
 Werner Stock 
 Toni Tetzlaff 
 Rolf Wenkhaus
 Georg Kroschel 
 Kurt Thormann 
 Ewald Wenck

References

Bibliography 
 Waldman, Harry. Nazi Films in America, 1933-1942. McFarland, 2008.

External links 
 

1932 films
1930s sports comedy films
German sports comedy films
Films of the Weimar Republic
1930s German-language films
Films directed by Alfred Zeisler
Cycling films
German multilingual films
UFA GmbH films
German black-and-white films
1932 multilingual films
1932 comedy films
Films shot at Babelsberg Studios
1930s German films